Lak Lak or Laklak may refer to:

 Lak Lak, Hamadan, a village in Hamadan Province, western Iran
 Lak Lak Ashian, a village in Razavi Khorasan Province, northeastern Iran
 Lak Lag, or Lak Lak, a village in Razavi Khorasan Province, northeastern Iran
 Laklak (food), a Balinese traditional pancake
 Likak, or Lak Lak, a city in Boyer-Ahmad Province, southwestern Iran

See also
 Lak (disambiguation)